Alexander Quincy Morono (born August 16, 1990) is an American professional mixed martial artist who currently fights as a welterweight in the Ultimate Fighting Championship. A professional competitor since 2010, Morono has also fought for Legacy Fighting Championship, where he was the Welterweight Champion.

Background
Morono was born and raised in Houston, Texas, alongside three brothers. Alex's parents bought him a membership to LA Boxing gym where he began training in 2007, eventually noticing a jiu-jitsu class in the premises. He went on to join the class and was instantly hooked to the discipline. Morono also holds a professional kickboxing record of 1–0. Morono also cited The Matrix as inspiration for getting into MMA.

Morono earlier had the nickname of 'Baby Fedor' before he got 'The Great White' nickname after a sparring session.

Mixed martial arts career

Early career
In 2010, Morono began competing in Legacy Fighting Championship amateur series, amassing a record of 3–0–1.

Later that same year, Morono made his professional MMA debut, winning 21 seconds into the first round by armbar.

On December 4, 2015, Morono won the Legacy Fighting Championship Welterweight Championship with a first-round guillotine choke over Derrick Krantz.

Ultimate Fighting Championship
Morono stepped in on just over a week's notice to face Kyle Noke replacing an injured Kelvin Gastelum at UFC 195. Morono was awarded a split decision victory.

Morono was expected to face James Moontasri on October 15, 2016 at UFC Fight Night 97. However, the promotion announced on October 6 that they had cancelled the event entirely. In turn, the pairing was quickly rescheduled and eventually took place on December 17, 2016 at UFC on Fox 22. Morono won the fight by unanimous decision.

Morono was expected to face Sheldon Westcott on February 4, 2017 at UFC Fight Night 104. However, Westcott pulled out of the fight in early January and was replaced by Niko Price. He lost the fight via knockout at the end of the second round; however this was later overturned to a no contest after Price tested positive for marijuana.

Morono faced Keita Nakamura on September 23, 2017 at  UFC Fight Night: Saint Preux vs. Okami. He lost the fight by split decision.

Morono faced Joshua Burkman on February 18, 2018 at UFC Fight Night 126. He won the fight via a guillotine choke submission in the first round.

Morono faced Jordan Mein on July 28, 2018 at UFC on Fox 30. He lost the fight via unanimous decision. After the loss, Morono decided to change camps, joining Fortis MMA.

Morono faced Song Kenan on November 24, 2018 at UFC Fight Night 141. He won the fight via unanimous decision. The win also earned him the Fight of the Night bonus.

Morono faced Zak Ottow on March 9, 2019 at UFC on ESPN+ 4. He won the fight via verbal submission due to elbow strikes in the first round.

Morono faced Max Griffin on October 12, 2019 at UFC on ESPN+ 19. He won the fight via unanimous decision.

Morono was scheduled to face Dhiego Lima on February 8, 2020 at UFC 247. However on January 22, 2020, Lima was forced to withdraw from the bout due to a neck injury,  and he was replaced by Khaos Williams.  He lost the fight via knockout in round one.

Morono faced Rhys McKee on November 14, 2020 at UFC Fight Night: Felder vs. dos Anjos. He won the fight via unanimous decision.

As the first fight of his new multi-fight contract, Morono faced Anthony Pettis at UFC Fight Night: Thompson vs. Neal on December 19, 2020. He lost the fight via unanimous decision.

Morono faced Donald Cerrone, replacing Diego Sanchez on May 8, 2021 at UFC on ESPN 24. He won the fight via technical knockout late in the first round. This fight earned him the Performance of the Night award.

Morono faced David Zawada, replacing Sergey Khandozhko, on September 4, 2021 at UFC Fight Night 191. He won the fight via unanimous decision.

Morono faced Mickey Gall on December 4, 2021 at UFC on ESPN 31. He won the fight via unanimous decision.

Morono faced Matthew Semelsberger on July 30, 2022 at UFC 277. He won the fight by unanimous decision.

Morono faced Santiago Ponzinibbio at UFC 282 on Saturday, December 10, 2022, replacing an injured Robbie Lawler. He lost the fight via technical knockout.

Personal life
Morono and his wife Janice co-own the Gracie Barra The Woodlands gym.

Championships and achievements
 Legacy Fighting Championship
LFC Welterweight Championship (one time)
Ultimate Fighting Championship
Fight of the Night (one time) 
Performance of the Night (one time)

Mixed martial arts record
 

|- 
|Loss
|align=center|22–8 (1)
|Santiago Ponzinibbio
|KO (punches)
|UFC 282
|
|align=center|3
|align=center|2:29
|Las Vegas, Nevada, United States
|
|-
|Win
|align=center|22–7 (1)
|Matthew Semelsberger
|Decision (unanimous)
|UFC 277
|
|align=center|3
|align=center|5:00
|Dallas, Texas, United States
|
|-
|Win
|align=center|21–7 (1)
|Mickey Gall
|Decision (unanimous)
|UFC on ESPN: Font vs. Aldo 
|
|align=center|3
|align=center|5:00
|Las Vegas, Nevada, United States
|
|-
|Win
|align=center|20–7 (1)
|David Zawada
|Decision (unanimous)
|UFC Fight Night: Brunson vs. Till
|
|align=center|3
|align=center|5:00
|Las Vegas, Nevada, United States
|
|-
|Win
|align=center|19–7 (1)
|Donald Cerrone
|TKO (punches)
|UFC on ESPN: Rodriguez vs. Waterson
|
|align=center|1
|align=center|4:40
|Las Vegas, Nevada, United States
|
|-
|Loss
|align=center|18–7 (1)
|Anthony Pettis
|Decision (unanimous)
|UFC Fight Night: Thompson vs. Neal
|
|align=center|3
|align=center|5:00
|Las Vegas, Nevada, United States
|
|-
|Win
|align=center|18–6 (1)
|Rhys McKee
|Decision (unanimous)
|UFC Fight Night: Felder vs. dos Anjos
|
|align=center|3
|align=center|5:00
|Las Vegas, Nevada, United States
|
|-
|Loss
|align=center|17–6 (1)
|Khaos Williams
|KO (punches)
|UFC 247
|
|align=center|1
|align=center|0:27
|Houston, Texas, United States
|
|-
|Win
|align=center|17–5 (1)
|Max Griffin
|Decision (unanimous)
|UFC Fight Night: Joanna vs. Waterson
|
|align=center|3
|align=center|5:00
|Tampa, Florida, United States
|
|-
|Win
|align=center|16–5 (1)
|Zak Ottow
|TKO (submission to elbows)
|UFC Fight Night: Lewis vs. dos Santos
|
|align=center|1
|align=center|3:34
|Wichita, Kansas, United States
|
|-
|Win
|align=center|15–5 (1)
|Song Kenan
|Decision (unanimous)
|UFC Fight Night: Blaydes vs. Ngannou 2
|
|align=center|3
|align=center|5:00
|Beijing, China
|
|-
|Loss
|align=center|14–5 (1)
|Jordan Mein
|Decision (unanimous)
|UFC on Fox: Alvarez vs. Poirier 2
|
|align=center|3
|align=center|5:00
|Calgary, Alberta, Canada
|
|-
|Win
|align=center|14–4 (1)
|Josh Burkman
|Submission (guillotine choke)
|UFC Fight Night: Cowboy vs. Medeiros
|
|align=center|1
|align=center|2:12
|Austin, Texas, United States
|
|-
|Loss
|align=center|13–4 (1)
|Keita Nakamura
|Decision (split)
|UFC Fight Night: Saint Preux vs. Okami
|
|align=center|3
|align=center|5:00
|Saitama, Japan
|
|-
|NC
|align=center|13–3 (1)
|Niko Price
|NC (overturned)
|UFC Fight Night: Bermudez vs. The Korean Zombie
|
|align=center|2
|align=center|5:00
|Houston, Texas, United States
|
|-
|Win
|align=center|13–3
|James Moontasri
|Decision (unanimous)
|UFC on Fox: VanZant vs. Waterson
|
|align=center|3
|align=center|5:00
|Sacramento, California, United States
|
|-
|Win
|align=center|12–3
|Kyle Noke
|Decision (split)
|UFC 195
|
|align=center|3
|align=center|5:00
|Las Vegas, Nevada, United States
|
|-
|Win
|align=center|11–3
|Derrick Krantz
|Submission (guillotine choke)
|Legacy FC 49
|
|align=center|1
|align=center|4:29
|Bossier City, Louisiana, United States
|
|-
|Win
|align=center|10–3
|Valdir Araújo
|KO (punch)
|Legacy FC 44
|
|align=center|3
|align=center|2:18
|Houston, Texas, United States
|
|-
|Win
|align=center|9–3
|Marcus Andrusia
|TKO (punches and elbows)
|Legacy FC 42
|
|align=center|1
|align=center|3:18
|Lake Charles, Louisiana, United States
|
|-
|Win
|align=center|8–3
|Rashid Abdullah
|Submission (triangle choke)
|Fury Fighting 4
|
|align=center|1
|align=center|1:36
|Humble, Texas, United States
|
|-
|Win
|align=center|7–3
|Larry Hopkins
|TKO (punches)
|Fury Fighting 2
|
|align=center|1
|align=center|0:44
|Humble, Texas, United States
|
|-
|Loss
|align=center|6–3
|Diego Henrique da Silva
|TKO (punches)
|Legacy FC 31
|
|align=center|1
|align=center|1:55
|Houston, Texas, United States
|
|-
|Win
|align=center|6–2
|Rashid Abdullah
|DQ (illegal bite)
|Texas City Throwdown 1
|
|align=center|3
|align=center|0:10
|Texas City, Texas, United States
|
|-
|Loss
|align=center|5–2
|Rob Wood
|Decision (split)
|Fury Fighting 1
|
|align=center|3
|align=center|5:00
|Humble, Texas, United States
|
|-
|Win
|align=center|5–1
|Brandon Farran
|Submission (armbar)
|Legacy FC 18
|
|align=center|1
|align=center|1:16
|Houston, Texas, United States
|
|-
|Win
|align=center|4–1
|Rashon Lewis
|TKO (punches)
|Legacy FC 10
|
|align=center|1
|align=center|4:02
|Houston, Texas, United States
|
|-
|Win
|align=center|3–1
|Evert Gutierrez
|Decision (unanimous)
|Legacy FC 8
|
|align=center|3
|align=center|3:00
|Houston, Texas, United States
|
|-
|Loss
|align=center|2–1
|Jeff Rexroad
|Decision (split)
|Legacy FC 6
|
|align=center|3
|align=center|3:00
|Houston, Texas, United States
|
|-
|Win
|align=center|2–0
|Mark Garcia
|Submission (armbar)
|Legacy FC 5
|
|align=center|1
|align=center|0:41
|Houston, Texas, United States
|
|-
|Win
|align=center|1–0
|Jose Castro
|Submission (armbar)
|Triple A: Promotions
|
|align=center|1
|align=center|0:21
|Laredo, Texas, United States
|

See also
 List of current UFC fighters
 List of male mixed martial artists

References

External links
 
 

1990 births
Living people
American male mixed martial artists
American male taekwondo practitioners
American practitioners of Brazilian jiu-jitsu
People awarded a black belt in Brazilian jiu-jitsu
Sportspeople from Houston
Mixed martial artists from Texas
Welterweight mixed martial artists
Middleweight mixed martial artists
Mixed martial artists utilizing taekwondo
Mixed martial artists utilizing Brazilian jiu-jitsu
Ultimate Fighting Championship male fighters